Cleartrip (previously known as Cleartrip Travel Services Private Limited) is a global online travel company, headquartered in Mumbai. The company operates an online travel aggregator website for booking flights, train tickets, hotel reservations, and activities in India and the Middle East countries. It holds offices across India, UAE, Saudi Arabia and Egypt.

History 
Cleartrip was founded in 2006 as a hotels and air aggregator by Stuart Crighton, Hrush Bhatt, and Matthew Spacie. Seeing the fragmentation that existed in the Indian travel and hospitality sector, the founders decided to enter the online travel space.

Cleartrip also operates Cleartrip for Business, an online corporate travel management tool; Agent Box, a travel tool for travel agents; and Cleartrip Mobile, a travel booking app for mobile devices. In 2012, it launched new services such as Quickeys, a hotel booking application and other journey planning services.

In April 2012, Cleartrip launched iOS app with a split-screen search feature to enable round-trip search results. Its app also came with geo-location feature to choose the airport for departure from the current location. The search platform of the app also allows users to swap the from and to cities with a tap. The app also runs on both IOS and Android.

In January 2013, Cleartrip brought air, rail and bus tickets to Apple's Passbook. The same year the company undertook a massive UI redesign project, Tuxedo where every field in the website was thought through in terms of placement, display, action.

In 2014, Cleartrip Mobile was recognized as part of Apple's Best of 2014 Trends of the year and also featured as the ‘Editor's Pick.

In 2015, Cleartrip became the first Indian online travel agency to feature on Apple Watch and by the end of 2015, its app traffic had overtaken web traffic and accounted for 59 per cent of its total traffic. By May 2016 nearly 75% of Cleartrip's traffic was coming via mobile.

In April 2018, Cleartrip launched an Arabic version of its website to target the growing Arabic community in the GCC region.

In May 2018, Cleartrip launched an app for Amazon's Alexa voice assistant that enables Alexa users to voice search air travel options.

With gross booking value of $1.4 billion and revenues worth of $110 million, Cleartrip has annual growth of over 40% in MENA, driven by the increasing shift from offline to online.

In 2018, Cleartrip was named as one among the only two companies that followed the GDPR and allowed users to delete personal information associated with their accounts.

In June 2020, Cleartrip announced the launch of TravelSafe – an initiative that allowed customers to get information of the latest travel restrictions on account of the COVID-19 pandemic.

Since the acquisition of Cleartrip by Flipkart, the company has participated in the Flipkart Big Billion Day event in October 2021. It has signed up Anil Kapoor as its brand ambassador.

The company has announced its plan to expand its workforce by 50% by March 2022.

In October 2021, Cleartrip appointed former Myntra executive Ayyappan R as its new CEO.

Partnership 
In 2017, Google announced partnership with Cleartrip for its flight search application, Google Flights.

In May 2018, Cleartrip had extended its partnership with Klook and Musement, global activity platforms to amplify its integrated travel services in 48 European and 18 Southeast Asian countries.

In June 2018, Cleartrip announced its partnership with Kerala Tourism Development Corporation to become an online seller of KTDC's exclusive set of activities.

In 2019, e-commerce company Amazon forayed into the flight booking space by partnering with Cleartrip.

In November 2019, Cleartrip entered into a partnership with PAYBACK India for a loyalty program.

In 2021, Cleartrip expanded its partnership with Sabre as a strategy to streamline its GDS relationships and to make Sabre its GDS partner.

Shareholding 
Kleiner Perkins Caufield & Byers, Ram Shriram and DAG Ventures were some of the early investors in Cleartrip.

In April 2021, Cleartrip was acquired in an undisclosed deal by Walmart owned Flipkart.

In October 2021, the Adani group picked up a minority stake in Cleartrip for an undisclosed amount.

Geographic Expansion 
In May 2010, Cleartrip launched its first overseas venture in the UAE. In May 2012, it expanded its operations to the Persian Gulf nations of Oman, Qatar, Kuwait, Bahrain, and Saudi Arabia. On June 21, 2018, Cleartrip announced the acquisition of Saudi Arabia-based online travel aggregator Flyin.

References

External links
 

Online travel agencies
Indian travel websites
Travel ticket search engines
Indian companies established in 2006
Transport companies established in 2006
Internet properties established in 2006
Travel and holiday companies of India
Online retailers of India
Companies based in Mumbai
2006 establishments in Maharashtra